Martin Imboden (born 12 December 1963) is a Swiss Paralympic archer.

He has competed once at the Summer Paralympics, four times at the World Para Archery Championships and twice at the Para Continental Championships.

105 Swiss athletes were sent to Rio Olympic Games and 21 of those were paralympians. Imboden and Magali Comte were the only paralympian archers.

References

Paralympic archers of Switzerland
Archers at the 2016 Summer Paralympics
Living people
Swiss male archers
1963 births